Semisi Tora (born 28 January 1979) is a Fijian rugby league footballer who represented his country at the 2008 Rugby League World Cup. He is the son of dual-code rugby international Kaiava Salusalu.

As of 2012, he was playing for the Nyngan Tigers. Tora also competed for Fiji at the 2006 Pacific Cup.

References

External links
Fiji v France: Teams

Living people
Fijian rugby league players
Fiji national rugby league team players
1979 births
Parkes Spacemen players
Rugby league props
Rugby league second-rows
Sportspeople from Lautoka